Adnan Khan (born 24 December 1988) is an Indian actor who appears in Hindi Films, Hindi Television and Web series. He is best known for his role as Mawlawi Kabeer Ahmed in Zee TV's drama series Ishq Subhan Allah.

Early life 

Khan hails from Dubai, United Arab Emirates. He was born on the 24 December 1988. He has an older brother named Imran Ali. Adnan went to Our Own English High School in Dubai and graduated from the esteemed Manipal University Dubai in the year 2009. He holds a degree in Business Administration (BBA With Specialization In International Business Management). Khan briefly worked as a Human Resources Manager in a Dubai-based firm and left his job as he always looked forward to a career in acting.

Career
Whilst working as a Human Resources Manager in Dubai based firm, Khan aspired a career in acting. His short film 'Bubble' shot in Dubai was screened at various international film festivals and won Best Short Film at Tunisia Human Rights Film Festival.

Then he relocated to Mumbai from Dubai and completed an acting diploma at the highly reputed "Actor Prepares", an acting academy founded by veteran actor Anupam Kher. After, Khan went on to participate in numerous stage dramas, short films and web series the most notable being First Among Equals, web series written and produced by Vikram Bhatt.

In March 2018, Khan portrayed  the role of Maulwi Kabeer Ahmed in Zee TV's show Ishq Subhan Allah opposite Eisha Singh and won many accolades for his performance, including Indian Telly Award for Fresh New Face - Male and International Iconic - Best Television Actor. The show ran for two and half years  and dealt with the sensitive and burning issue of Triple Talaq. In May 2018, Khan appeared in Zee TV's talk show "Juzz Baat" as a guest with Sana Saeed, Arjit Taneja and Karan Jotwani.

In February 2019, Khan did an ad-campaign for Platinum love bands (Platinum days of love).

In January 2021, Khan did an ad-campaign for SNASH Redefining Car Care based in Dubai, United Arab Emirates. In March 2021, he appeared in a T-Series music video "Mera Aapki kripa Se". In May 2021, Khan made his digital debut with Alt Balaji's web series Hai Taubba portraying the role of Giri Raj.

In January 2022, Khan portrayed the role of Peter in a short film; The Rage- Over Injustice screened at Cannes Film Festival and released on MX Player. In March 2022, he appeared in a music video, Mainu Ishq Nahi Karna opposite Aaira Dwivedi released on Zee Music Company.
In April 2022, Khan appeared on Sahurnya Pesbukers a TV show on antv in Indonesia . In September 2022, Khan next starred alongside Rakesh Bedi and Shagun Sharma in yet another short film Mera Number Kab Aageya, which was a dystopian tale set in 2030 where pregnancy requires government licenses and couples seeking children only to resolve their personal conflicts require introspection. The film was appreciated for its unique concept, officially selected and premiered at various film festivals winning over 25 awards. For his performance, Khan won Best Actor at NexGn International Short Film Festival 2021 Excellence and Appreciation Awards. Since December 2022, Khan is portraying the lead role in Sony Entertainment Television's drama series Katha Ankahee opposite Aditi Sharma.

Filmography

Films

Television

Web series

Music videos

Awards and nominations

References

External links

Living people
1988 births
Indian male television actors
Male actors in Hindi television
Indian male soap opera actors
Manipal Academy of Higher Education alumni
21st-century Indian male actors